Rhein-Neckar Löwen is a professional handball club founded in 2002, based in Mannheim, Germany. The club competes in the German Handball-Bundesliga and continentally in EHF European League. Rhein-Neckar Löwen play their home games in SAP Arena, with a seating capacity of 14,500.

The club won the German championship twice under the leadership of Nikolaj Jacobsen, in 2016 and in 2017.

History
On 1 July 2002, the club was founded, originally named SG Kronau/Östringen, following a merger between two clubs, TSG Kronau and TSV Baden Östringen. Their home ground was Rhein-Neckar-Halle. In their first season, 2002–03, the club succeeded to achieve promoting from the 2. Bundesliga to the top tier of the German handball, the Handball-Bundesliga. A season after, in 2003–04, they were relegated from the 16th position, but they returned again to the first Bundesliga in 2004–05 season, after finishing the season in the 2nd place of the 2. Bundesliga. In 2005–06 season, SG Kronau/Östringen home games were moved from the old Rhein-Neckar-Halle to the newly built SAP Arena in Mannheim. In this season, they reached the final of DHB Cup. They lost 25–26 to HSV Hamburg, and finished 6th in the Handball-Bundesliga. In the following season, they lost again in DHB Cup final, with a 33–31 to THW Kiel, and finished 8th in the Handball-Bundesliga.

In the beginning of 2007–08 season, the club's name renamed to Rhein-Neckar Löwen. This season, they lost in the final of EHF Cup Winners' Cup to MKB Veszprém. The Hungarians secured the title after a 60:65 win on aggregate over Rhein-Neckar Löwen. In this season, Löwen's youth team won the German championship for the first time in the history of the club. The 2008–09 season was Rhein-Neckar Löwen's best season by then, finishing 3rd in Bundesliga, and reaching the semi-final of EHF Champions League, in their first time in this competition. In 2009–10, Rhein-Neckar Löwen reached the German Cup final again. It was their third appearance in the cup final, but again they finished as runners-up, this time after a 33–34 loss to HSV Hamburg.

The club won its first title on 19 May 2013, after beating HBC Nantes (26–24) in the Final Four of EHF Cup, on its first year as EHF Cup, a merge between EHF European Cup and EHF Cup Winners' Cup.

In 2013–14, Rhein-Neckar Löwen reached the DHB Cup Final Four for the seventh time in its history, but defeated by SG Flensburg (26–30) in the semi-final. In the EHF Champions League, Löwen reached the quarterfinals, and won FC Barcelona (38–31) at home, but in Palau Blaugrana they lost, 24–31, and were eliminated from EHF Champions League because of the away goals. In the Bundesliga, Löwen headed to the final game of the season as table leaders, with the same total of points like THW Kiel. Although they won VfL Gummersbach (40–35), they lost the championship to THW Kiel, who won Füchse Berlin, with a better result, 37–23. THW Kiel finished the season with a better goals difference and won the championship. Löwen finished only second.

A season after, in 2014–15, Rhein-Neckar Löwen appointed Nikolaj Jacobsen as their new head coach. He led Löwen again to the second place, and they finished as runners-up to THW Kiel for the second season in a row. But in 2015–16, Jacobsen was the first head coach to lead Löwen to a national championship, as they beat SG Flensburg by a one point. They also won the DHB-Supercup after a 27–24 win over SC Magdeburg. A season after, in 2016–17, they defended the title and achieved their second Bundesliga championship in their history.

Kits

Accomplishments
Handball-Bundesliga:
: 2016, 2017
DHB-Pokal:
: 2018
DHB-Supercup:
:  2016, 2017, 2018
EHF Cup:
: 2013

Team
Squad for the 2022–23 season

Goalkeepers
1  Mikael Appelgren
 29  David Späth
 35  Joel Birlehm
Left wingers
3  Uwe Gensheimer (c)
 13  Benjamin Helander
Right wingers
 24  Patrick Groetzki
 26  Niklas Michalski
Line players
 27  Kristjan Horžen
 33  Ýmir Örn Gíslason
 80  Jannik Kohlbacher 

Left backs
 45  Halil Jaganjac 
 65  Lukas Nilsson 
Central backs
 10  Juri Knorr
 25  Olle Forsell Schefvert
Right backs
4  Elias Scholtes
6  Niclas Kirkeløkke
 23  Albin Lagergren

Transfers
Transfers for the 2023–24 season

 Joining
  Lion Zacharias  (LW) (back from loan at  Eulen Ludwigshafen)
  Philipp Ahouansou (LB) (back from loan at  GWD Minden)
  Gustav Davidsson (LB) (from  Hammarby IF) ?
  Jon Lindenchrone (RB) (from  Frisch Auf Göppingen)

 Leaving
  Benjamin Helander (LW) (to  Alingsås HK)
  Lukas Nilsson (LB) (to  Aalborg Håndbold) 
  Albin Lagergren (RB) (to  SC Magdeburg)
  Elias Scholtes (RB) (to  Bergischer HC)

Notable former players

Notable former coaches
  Nikolaj Jacobsen
  Michael Roth
  Christian Schwarzer
  Frédéric Volle
  Yuri Shevtsov
  Ola Lindgren
  Guðmundur Guðmundsson

References

External links

 Official website

German handball clubs
Handball-Bundesliga
Handball clubs established in 2002
2002 establishments in Germany
Sport in Mannheim